Muhammad Taqi al-Din bin Ibrahim bin Mustafa bin Isma'il bin Yusuf al-Nabhani (1914 – December 11, 1977) was an Islamic scholar from Jerusalem who founded the Islamist political party Hizb ut-Tahrir.

Biography
Al-Nabhani was born in 1909 in a village by the name of Ijzim near Haifa in the Ottoman Empire and belonged to Bani Nabhan tribe. His father was a lecturer in Sharia law and his mother was also an Islamic scholar. al-Nabhani studied Sharia law at Al-Azhar University and the Dar-ul-Ulum college of Cairo. He graduated in 1931 and returned to Palestine. There he was first a teacher and then as a jurist, rising to Sharia judge in the court of appeal. Disturbed by the creation of the state of Israel and the 1948 Arab–Israeli War and occupation of Palestine, he founded the Hizb ut-Tahrir party in 1953. The party was immediately banned in Jordan. Al-Nabhani was banned from returning to Jordan and settled in Beirut. He died on December 20, 1977.

Political philosophy
Al-Nabhani proclaimed that the depressed political condition of Muslims in the contemporary world stemmed from the abolition of the Caliphate in 1924. al-Nabhani was critical of the way the Middle East had been carved up into nation states allied with various imperial powers. Other causes of stagnation included the Ottoman Empire's closing of the doors of ijtihad, its failure to understand "the intellectual and legislative side of Islam", and neglect of the Arabic language.

In his most famous works, written in the early 1950s, al-Nabhani expressed a radical disillusionment with the secular powers that had failed to protect Palestinian nationalism. He argued for a new caliphate that would be brought about by "peaceful politics and ideological subversion" and eventually cover the world replacing all nation states. Its political and economic order would be founded on Islamic principles, not materialism that, in his view, was the outcome of capitalist economies.

Al-Nabhani also wrote The Economic System in Islam, a book on Islamic views on economic principles and the contradictions between them and Western-based capitalism and socialism. It was published in Arabic in 1953 and translated into English and a number of other languages.

Influence
Hizb ut-Tahrir did not attract a large following in the countries where it was established. Despite this, al-Nabhani's works have become an important part of contemporary Islamist literature.

Bibliography

}

References

Citations

 http://www.nabahani.com/articles/gnlgwnw-hizb-ut-tahrir-and-the-rafidah-shiah-enemies-of-the-sahaabah-part-1.cfm
 http://www.manhaj.com/manhaj/articles/rzaoo-taqi-ud-din-an-nabahani-hizb-ut-tahir-and-bathist-marxist-communism.cfm

Sources

Further reading

1909 births
1977 deaths
People from Haifa
Arab people in Mandatory Palestine
Palestinian Islamists
Palestinian refugees
Members of Hizb ut-Tahrir
Al-Azhar University alumni